The St Scholastica Day riot took place in Oxford, England, on 10 February 1355, Saint Scholastica's Day. The disturbance began when two students from the University of Oxford complained about the quality of wine served to them in the Swindlestock Tavern, which stood on Carfax, in the centre of the town. The students quarrelled with the taverner; the argument quickly escalated to blows. The inn's customers joined in on both sides, and the resulting melee turned into a riot. The violence started by the bar brawl continued over three days, with armed gangs coming in from the countryside to assist the townspeople. University halls and students' accommodation were raided and the inhabitants murdered; there were some reports of clerics being scalped. Around 30 townsfolk were killed, as were up to 63 members of the university.

Violent disagreements between townspeople and students had arisen several times previously, and 12 of the 29 coroners' courts held in Oxford between 1297 and 1322 concerned murders by students. The University of Cambridge was established in 1209 by scholars who left Oxford following the lynching of two students by the town's citizens.

King Edward III sent judges to the town with commissions of oyer and terminer to determine what had gone on and to advise what steps should be taken. He came down on the side of the university authorities, who were given additional powers and responsibilities to the disadvantage of the town's authorities. The town was fined 500 marks and its mayor and bailiffs were sent to the Marshalsea prison in London. John Gynwell, the Bishop of Lincoln, imposed an interdict on the town for one year, which banned all religious practices, including services (except on key feast days), burials and marriages; only baptisms of young children were allowed.

An annual penance was imposed on the town: each year, on St Scholastica's Day, the mayor, bailiffs and sixty townspeople were to attend a Mass at the University Church of St Mary the Virgin for those killed; the town was also made to pay the university a fine of one penny for each scholar killed. The practice was dropped in 1825; in 1955—the 600th anniversary of the riots—in an act of conciliation the mayor was given an honorary degree and the vice-chancellor was made an honorary freeman of the city.

Background

Academic teaching has been ongoing at Oxford since 1096; as a university it grew rapidly from 1167 and was given a royal charter in 1248, formalising some of its positions and functions. In 1334 Oxford, a town of 5,000 residents, was the ninth wealthiest settlement in England. In 1349 the Black Death affected the town; many townspeople died or left, and a quarter of the scholars perished. The town began to recover soon afterwards, but its finances had been deeply affected. During the first part of the fourteenth century the population was aware of the decline of Oxford's fortunes, and this coincided with disturbance and unrest between the town and university.

Although co-operation between the university's senior members and the town's burgesses was the norm, town and gown rivalry existed and relations would periodically deteriorate into violence. On the occasions when peace settlements were imposed on the two sides, the outcome favoured the university. In 1209 two Oxford scholars were lynched by the town's locals following the death of a woman, and among those who left the town to study elsewhere were some who settled in Cambridge to start the university that year. In 1248 a Scottish scholar was murdered by the citizens; Robert Grosseteste, the Bishop of Lincoln, enforced a ban of excommunication on the culprits and Henry III fined the town's authorities 80 marks. Violence continued to break out periodically and 12 of the 29 coroners' courts held between 1297 and 1322 concerned murders by the students. Many of these went unpunished by the university or the law. In February 1298 a citizen was murdered by a student; one of the students was killed by townspeople. The townsfolk responsible for killing the scholar were excommunicated and the town was fined £200 in damages; there were no punishments given to the students. This was the first occasion that the town's bailiffs were recorded as taking part in the violence; it was a feature of several subsequent altercations.

Often the scholars rioted among themselves, as they did in 1252, 1267, 1273 and 1333–1334. By the early fourteenth century "altercations and violence between citizens and scholars were commonplace", according to the historian Laurence Brockliss. In a 1314 riot between the two main factions of the university—the Northernmen and the Southernmen—39 students were known to have committed murder or manslaughter; seven were arrested and the remainder sought religious sanctuary or escaped. In 1349 scholars from Merton College rioted to have John Wylliot, their preferred candidate, elected Chancellor of the University; and in 1411 scholars rioted against their chancellor.

Dispute

On 10 February 1355—Saint Scholastica Day—several university students went for a drink at the Swindlestock Tavern. The tavern was located in the centre of Oxford, on the corner of St Aldate's and Queen Street, at Carfax; the tavern was a regular drinking spot for the students. Two of the group were Walter de Spryngeheuse and Roger de Chesterfield, beneficed clergymen from South West England; de Spryngeheuse was the former rector of Hamden, Somerset. They were served wine by John de Croydon, who was the tavern's vintner or possibly the landlord, although the scholar Louis Brewer Hall and the antiquarian Anthony Wood, among others, describe him as a friend of John de Bereford, who was the tavern's owner and the mayor of Oxford. De Spryngeheuse and de Chesterfield complained to de Croydon that the wine was sub-standard and asked that they be served a better drink. De Croydon refused to listen to the complaints and, according to Wood, "several snappish words passed" between the men before de Croydon gave them "stubborn and saucy language". As a result de Chesterfield threw his drink in de Croydon's face. Sources differ on what happened next: according to those sympathetic to the university, de Chesterfield threw his wooden drinking vessel at de Croydon's head; those sympathetic to the townsfolk say the student beat him around the head with the pot. A petition by the town authorities to Parliament said the students "threw the said wine in the face of John Croidon, taverner, and then with the said quart pot beat the said John".

Other customers—both locals and students—joined in the fight, which spilled out of the tavern and onto the junction at Carfax. Within half an hour the brawl had developed into a riot. To summon assistance, the locals rang the bell at St Martin's, the town's church; the students rang the bells of the University Church of St Mary the Virgin. Humphrey de Cherlton, the Chancellor of the University, tried to calm both sides before things got too far out of hand, but arrows were shot at him and he retreated from the scene. Men from both sides armed themselves with cudgels, staves and bows and arrows. When night fell the violence died down; at this stage no-one had been killed or badly wounded.

The following morning, in an attempt to stop any recurrence of the violence, the Chancellor issued a proclamation at the churches of St Martin and St Mary that no-one should bear arms, assault anyone or disturb the peace. He was supported by the chief magistrate of the town. At the same time, the town's bailiffs were urging townsfolk to arm themselves; the bailiffs were also paying people in the surrounding countryside to come to aid the citizens. About eighty townsmen, armed with bows and other weapons, went to St Giles' Church in the north part of the town, where they knew some scholars were, and chased them to the Augustine priory, killing at least one student and badly injuring several others on the way. A master of theology was shot at when he tried to leave the priory. The bells of both the town and university churches were rung to rally the respective supporters; students locked and barricaded some of the town's gates, to stop an influx of outsiders coming at them from a new direction.

Late in the day of 11 February, up to 2,000 people from the countryside came in the western gate of the town to join the townsfolk, waving a black banner and crying: "Havoc! Havoc! Smyt fast, give gode knocks!" The students, unable to fight against such a number, withdrew to their halls where they barricaded themselves in. The citizens broke into five inns and hostels, where they finished off much of the food and drink; any student who was found in his rented rooms or hiding place was killed or maimed. After the violence subsided that night, the authorities from the town and the university went through the streets proclaiming in the king's name "that no man should injure the scholars or their goods under pain of forfeiture".

In the early hours of the following morning de Cherlton and other senior members of the university left for nearby Woodstock after having been summoned there by Edward III, who was staying in the village. The proclamation from the King to the townsfolk had no effect. They again rang the bell at St Martin's to rally their supporters and that day fourteen more inns and halls were sacked by the rioters, who killed any scholars they found. There were reports that some of the clerics were scalped, possibly "in scorn of the clergy" and their tonsures, according to Wood. Other student corpses were buried in dunghills, left in the gutters, dumped into privies or cesspits or thrown into the River Thames.

By the evening of the third day the passions of the townspeople had been spent. Many of the scholars had fled Oxford, and much of the town had been burnt down. Many of the student halls had been plundered or vandalised, except that of Merton College, whose students had a reputation for quietness and whose hall was made of stone. There is no known figure for the number of townspeople killed, but it may have been about 30. The number of students killed in the riots is a matter of disagreement among the sources: Wood thinks it was 40; others put the number at 63.

Resolution

After the rioting ended both the university hierarchy and the town burghers surrendered themselves and the rights of their respective entities to the king. He sent judges to the town with commissions of oyer and terminer to determine what had gone on and to advise what steps should be taken.  Four days later the King restored the rights of the scholars and gave them pardons for any offences. He fined the town 500 marks and sent the town's mayor and bailiffs to the Marshalsea prison in London. While the royal commission of inquiry was in place, John Gynwell, the Bishop of Lincoln, imposed an interdict on the townspeople, and banned all religious practices, including services (except on key feast days), burials and marriages; only baptisms of young children were allowed.

On 27 June 1355 Edward issued a royal charter that secured the rights of the university over those of the town. The document gave the chancellor of the university the right to tax bread and drink sold in the town, the power to assay the weights and measures used in commerce in Oxford and its environs, rights relating to the commercial side of Oxford and the power to insist that inhabitants kept their properties in good repair. The town authorities were left with the power to take action in legal situations where it involved citizens on both sides; any action that involved a student or the university on one side was dealt with by the university.

When the interdict was lifted by the Bishop of Lincoln, he imposed an annual penance on the town. Each year, on St Scholastica's Day, the mayor, bailiffs and sixty townspeople were to attend St Mary's church for mass for those killed; the town was also made to pay the university a fine of one penny for each scholar killed. When each new mayor or sheriff was sworn in, he had to swear to uphold all the university's rights.

Aftermath
A series of poems, "Poems Relating to the Riot Between Town and Gown on St. Scholastica's Day", was written; the work is in Latin. According to the historian Henry Furneaux, who edited the works in the nineteenth century, they could have been written between 1356 and 1357 or in the early fifteenth century.

The charter did not end the conflict between the town of Oxford and the university, although there was a hiatus in rioting. There were further incidents over the following centuries, although these were on a much smaller scale than the events of 1355. According to Cobban, "the St Scholastica's Day riot was ... the last of the extreme bloody encounters" between town and gown; subsequent grievances were settled in the courts or by appealing to the government. During the reign of Henry VIII both the university and the town authorities petitioned Thomas Wolsey about who held jurisdiction on various points.

The historian C. H. Lawrence observes that the charter "was the climax of a long series of royal privileges which raised the university from the status of a protected resident to that of the dominant power in the city". Scholars were free from interference from or prosecution by the civil authorities and the chancellor's jurisdiction covered both civil and religious matters in the town; it was a unique position for any university in Europe. The power of the university over the commercial aspects of the town ensured that the colleges were able to acquire much of the central areas of Oxford at the expense of merchants, and the dominance of the land ownership by the university, particularly in the Carfax environs, is as a result of the settlement following the riots. One unintended corollary of the growing power of the university was that the town's weakened authorities did not accommodate plays or theatre until the sixteenth century. The situation was exacerbated by a lack of a cathedral in the town, which meant no religious plays were performed for pilgrims.

The annual penance undertaken by the mayor continued until 1825 when the incumbent refused to take part and the practice was allowed to drop. At least one previous mayor had refused to take part in the annual event: he was fined heavily and his payment given to the Radcliffe Infirmary. In an act of conciliation on 10 February 1955—the 600th anniversary of the riots—the mayor, W. R. Gowers, was given an honorary degree; the vice-chancellor, Alic Halford Smith, was made an honorary freeman of the city, at a commemoration of the events of 1355.

Historiography
The historian Alan Cobban  observes that the two contemporary histories of the events differ in their allocation of blame; he considers that "given that propaganda and exaggeration were involved in these accounts, the whole truth may never be found." He identifies two sources of primary documentation, Oxford City Documents, Financial and Judicial, 1258–1665, edited by the historian Thorold Rogers in 1891, and Medieval Archives of the University of Oxford: Vol 1, edited by the historian the Rev Herbert Salter in 1920. The historian Jeremy Catto adds Collectanea, edited by Montagu Burrows of the Oxford Historical Society in 1896.

See also 
 Medieval university
 University of Paris strike, 1229
 Authentica habita
 Benefit of clergy
 Battle of Carfax

Notes and references

Notes

References

Sources

Books

Journals and magazines

News sources

Websites

External links
 "Poems Relating to the Riot Between Town and Gown on St. Scholastica's Day", 1896

1355 in England
14th century in England
14th-century riots
Riots and civil disorder in England
Protests
Events in Oxford
History of the University of Oxford